Clarkia lingulata is a rare species of wildflower known by the common name Merced clarkia. This plant is endemic to Mariposa County, California, where it is known from only two sites near the Merced River.

It is thought to have evolved very rapidly, outside the usual model of allopatric speciation, from its parental species Clarkia biloba.

It is a state-listed endangered species in California.

Description
Clarkia lingulata erects a spindly stem rarely exceeding  in height and bearing sparse narrow leaves.

The saucer-shaped flowers have four bright pink spoon-shaped petals 1 to 2 centimeters long and sometimes flecked with red. There are eight stamens with lavender anthers.

References

External links
Jepson Manual Profile — Clarkia lingulata
Clarkia lingulata — U.C. Photo gallery

lingulata
Endemic flora of California
Flora of the Sierra Nevada (United States)
~
Natural history of Mariposa County, California
Plants described in 1953